Sangseela is town and union council of Dera Bugti District in the Balochistan province of Pakistan. The town lies in area that was affected by the Balouch insurgency.

References

Populated places in Dera Bugti District
Union councils of Balochistan, Pakistan